The NHIAA (New Hampshire Interscholastic Athletic Association) is the governing body for competitions among all public and some private high schools in the state of New Hampshire. There are currently 57 schools (with five combining as one team) that have participating football programs throughout the state.

Division memberships 
The NHIAA divided football into as few as three, but as many as six divisions between 1992 and 2017. There are four divisions in the state starting with the 2018 season.

Go here for past divisional alignments.

(*) indicates multi-school co-op programs.

Division I (21 Teams in Three Divisions)

West 
 Bedford
 Bishop Guertin
 Goffstown
 Keene
 Merrimack
 Nashua North
 Nashua South

Central 
 Alvirne
 Concord
 Londonderry
 Manchester Central
 Pinkerton
 Salem
 Windham

East 
 Dover
 Exeter
 Manchester Memorial
 Portsmouth-Oyster River*
 Spaulding
 Timberlane
 Winnacunnet

Division II (18 Teams in Two Divisions)

East 
 Bow
 Gilford–Belmont*
 Kennett
 Laconia
 Merrimack Valley
 Pembroke
 Plymouth
 Sanborn
 St. Thomas Aquinas

West 
 Hanover
 Hillsboro-Deering–Hopkinton*
 Hollis/Brookline
 John Stark
 Lebanon
 Manchester West
 Milford
 Pelham
 Souhegan

Division III (10 Teams in One Division) 
 Campbell
 ConVal
 Epping–Newmarket*
 Fall Mountain
 Inter-Lakes–Moultonborough*
 Kearsarge
 Kingswood
 Monadnock
 Stevens
 Trinity

Division IV (8 Teams in One Division) 
 Bishop Brady
 Franklin
 Mascoma Valley
 Newfound
 Newport
 Raymond
 Somersworth
 Winnisquam

State Champions (1951-present)

NHIAA State Football Champions since 1951

2018-present (Four Divisions)

2013-2017 (Three Divisions)

2008-2012 (Six Divisions)

2004-2007 (Five Divisions)

1994-2003 (Four Divisions)

1992-1993 (Three Divisions)

1989-1991 (Three Classes)

1972-1988 (Three Divisions)

1957-1971 (Four Divisions)

1951-1956 (Three Classes) 

NOTES:

(*) Newport's Towle High School closed and was converted to an elementary school in 1966 as high school students moved into the new Newport High School.
(**) Three Manchester Catholic high schools, St. Anthony's High School and Bishop Bradley High School and Immaculata High School, closed and were merged into Trinity High School in 1970.
(***) Concord's St. John's High School was converted into an elementary/middle school in 1963 upon the opening of Bishop Brady High School.

(****) Salem's Woodbury High School was converted to a middle school upon the opening of Salem High School in 1966.
(*****) Hampton Academy and High School was converted to a junior high school (Hampton Academy) after the opening of Winnacunnet High School in 1958.

References

External links
 NHIAA official site

Organizations based in New Hampshire
American football in New Hampshire
Nhiaa